The 1985 German motorcycle Grand Prix was the third round of the 1985 Grand Prix motorcycle racing season. It took place on the weekend of 17–19 May 1985 at the Hockenheimring.

Classification

500 cc

References

German motorcycle Grand Prix
German
Motorcycle